Shiraz Kassam Dharsi (17 April 1947 – 23 June 2020) was an Indian-born Pakistani cricketer and teacher.

Career
Dharsi played in 49 first-class matches in India and Pakistan from 1965/66 to 1973/74. He scored more than 2,000 runs in his career.

Dharsi then moved to England and played for Blackpool Cricket Club in the Northern Premier Cricket League as a professional for two seasons in 1975 and 1976, also working as a coach at Rossall School. He later took a PGCE at Durham University and represented the university first team. Following graduation he moved to Scotland to work at Strathallan School as a boarding-house tutor and cricket coach; and made five appearances for the Scotland national team, all in 1980. 

Dharsi eventually returned to England, where he worked at Highgate School (1985–1997) as a housemaster, additionally coaching cricket and squash.

References

External links
 

1947 births
2020 deaths
Pakistani cricketers
Karachi Blues cricketers
Karachi Greens cricketers
North Zone cricketers
Public Works Department cricketers
Railways cricketers
Sindh cricketers
Cricketers from Mumbai
Scotland cricketers
Alumni of the College of St Hild and St Bede, Durham